There have been two baronetcies created for persons with the surname Yate, one in the Baronetage of England and one in the Baronetage of the United Kingdom. Both creations are extinct.

The Yate Baronetcy, of Buckland in the County of Berkshire, was created in the Baronetage of England on 30 July 1622 for Edward Yate. The title became extinct on the death of the fourth Baronet in 1690.

The Yate Baronetcy, of Madeley Hall in the County of Shropshire, was created in the Baronetage of the United Kingdom on 31 January 1921 for the colonial administrator and Conservative politician Charles Yate. His only son predeceased him and the title became extinct on Yate's death in 1940.

Yate baronets, of Buckland (1622)

Sir Edward Yate, 1st Baronet (died )
Sir John Yate, 2nd Baronet (died )
Sir Charles Yate, 3rd Baronet (died c. 1680)
Sir John Yate, 4th Baronet (died 1690)

Yate baronets, of Madeley Hall (1921)
Sir Charles Edward Yate, 1st Baronet (1849–1940)

References

Extinct baronetcies in the Baronetage of England
Extinct baronetcies in the Baronetage of the United Kingdom